Pemba South Region or South Pemba Region  (Mkoa wa Pemba Kusini in Swahili) is one of the 31 regions of Tanzania. The region is comparable in size to the combined land area of the nation state of Grenada. and the administrative region is located entirely on the island of Pemba. Pemba South Region is bordered to the south by Indian Ocean, north by Pemba North Region and the west by Pemba channel. The regional capital is Mkoani. According to the 2012 census, the region has a total population of 195,116 .

Administrative divisions

Districts
Pemba South Region is divided into two districts, each administered by a council:

References

 
Pemba Island
Regions of Tanzania